The Alliance for Safe Children (TASC) is a non-profit organization formed in 2002 to address the issue of child injury in the developing world. The founder is Pete Peterson, former United States Ambassador to Vietnam. Michael Linnon is the technical director.

TASC works in cooperation with other organizations, such as the Red Cross and UNICEF.
Its aims include raising awareness of child injury; promoting injury prevention programs; conducting and supporting research; and 
raising funds and creating alliances with NGOs, international organisations and governments so that the number of child injuries can be reduced.
TASC's objectives are driven in part by studies suggesting that far more children die from preventable injury than from infectious disease - according to UNICEF about one million children die of preventable injuries each year. A common specific cause of death is drowning.

2004 conference and 2008 report
They worked with UNICEF, with whom they organized a conference in 2004 that reported on their findings from surveys and research; the keynote speaker was Kul Gautam, Assistant Secretary-General of the United Nations and Deputy Executive Director of UNICEF, who praised TASC and its founder. The conference, according to a report to the Executive Board of UNICEF, was to lead to "the development of programmes on child injury prevention." In 2008 the results of their seven-year "groundbreaking study" were published, in a report that indicated that suffocation and drowning were the most easily preventable causes of death for children under five years of age. The publication of the report generated interest from printed media around the world and from Australian television.

International Drowning Research Centre

Since 2005, TASC has assisted organizations in providing swimming lessons for children in Bangladesh.  With help from the Australian government, TASC partnered with the Royal Life Saving Society Australia, in establishing an International Drowning Research Centre based in Dhaka and opened in August 2010.  In Bangladesh, an estimated 46 children drown each day, and four times as many nearly drown. The aim is to teach children, especially those from poorer sections of society, how to swim, with the focus being on teaching older children "who can not only save themselves but can also help others."  The centre also teaches cardiopulmonary resuscitation and basic rescue skills.

See also
 List of non-governmental organizations in Vietnam
 National Child Passenger Safety Board

References

External links
  The Alliance for Safe Children
National Child Passenger Safety Board

Organizations established in 2002
Foreign charities operating in Vietnam
Medical and health organizations based in Thailand
Children's charities based in the United States
Vienna, Virginia
Charities based in Virginia